Voskhod was a monthly Russian-Jewish periodical in the Russian Empire. It was published in St. Petersburg from 1881 to 1906. The magazine was a product of the Haskalah movement.

The circulation of Voskhod was just 950 copies in its first year. It increased to 4,397 copies in 1895.

References

1881 establishments in the Russian Empire
1906 disestablishments in the Russian Empire
Defunct magazines published in Russia
Jewish magazines
Magazines established in 1881
Magazines disestablished in 1906
Magazines published in Saint Petersburg
Magazines published in Russia
Russian-language magazines
Monthly magazines published in Russia
Haskalah